Adolf II of Waldeck (c. 1250 – 13 December 1302) was count of Waldeck from 1270 to 1276 and prince-bishop of Liège from 1301 to 1302.

Life
Adolf was a son of Count Henry III and of Mechthild of Cuyk-Arnsberg. In 1270 he succeeded his grandfather Adolf I of Waldeck as Count of Waldeck.  He arranged a treaty with his brothers Otto and Gottfried, which stipulated that one brother would marry Sophia of Hesse (a daughter of Landgrave Henry I of Hesse), and that the other brother would follow suit and also marry.  The brother to marry Sophia eventually turned out to be Otto. In 1276 Adolf fell from Otto's favour and became a priest, at first a canon of Liège Cathedral, and later a provost in the cathedrals of Trier and Utrecht.  His other brother Gottfried also entered the church, becoming a canon in Cologne and Liège Cathedrals, treasurer in Münster Cathedral and in 1304 bishop of Minden.  On the death of William II, Adolf was initially his intended successor as bishop of Utrecht but, under pressure from count John II of Holland, Adolf found his claims overridden in favour of appointing John's brother Guy of Avesnes.  Through Pope Boniface VIII he was granted the bishopric of Liège instead, but he died shortly afterwards.

1250 births
1302 deaths
Place of birth unknown
Place of death unknown
14th-century Roman Catholic bishops in the Holy Roman Empire
Prince-Bishops of Liège
House of Waldeck
Counts of Waldeck